Ayça Ayşin Turan (born 25 October 1992) is a Turkish actress best known for her roles as Meryem in Meryem, as Leyla Sancak in The Protector, and Haziran Sedefli Özgür in Ada Masali.

Early life
Turan's mother is from the city of Sinop. Her maternal family immigrated from Selânik (present-day Thessaloniki, Greece) to mainland Turkey after the Greek conquest of the city when the Ottoman Empire collapsed. Her father is from Kastamonu.
She is the youngest of seven siblings (five boys and two girls).

Turan became interested in acting and violin at a young age. She later studied film at the Department of Radio, TV and Cinema, Faculty of Communication, Istanbul University.

Filmography

References

External links
 

Living people
Turkish film actresses
Turkish television actresses
21st-century Turkish actresses
Actresses from Istanbul
Istanbul University alumni
1992 births